Yellow Mosque (also known as Zurud Mosque) is situated in the Hazarduari Palace complex at Murshidabad, West Bengal, India.

History
The Yellow Mosque is said to have been built by Nawab Siraj ud-Daulah in 1756-57, in the Hazarduari Palace complex, on the banks of the Bhagirathi River.

According to the Archaeological Survey of India, as mentioned in the List of Monuments of National Importance in West Bengal, the Yellow Mosque is an ASI Listed Monument.

Maps

Yellow Mosque picture gallery

See also
 Nawabs of Bengal and Murshidabad

References

External links

Mosques in Murshidabad
Tourist attractions in Murshidabad
Monuments of National Importance in West Bengal